Chronochromie (Time-Colour) is an orchestral work by French composer Olivier Messiaen, completed in 1960. It consists of seven movements:

The sixth movement consists of 18 string instruments playing different birdsong. The first performance was in Donaueschingen on 16 October 1960, conducted by Hans Rosbaud.

Instrumentation
The work is scored for the following orchestra:

Woodwinds

3 bassoons

Brass
4 horns

3 trombones
1 tuba

Percussion (6 players)
1 glockenspiel
1 xylophone
1 marimba
  bells
3 gongs
  suspended cymbal
  chinese cymbal
  tam-tam

Strings
16 Violin I's
16 Violin II's
14 Violas
12 Celli
10 Double basses

References

Further reading
 Bauer, Amy. 2008. "The Impossible Charm of Messiaen's Chronochromie". In Messiaen Studies, edited by Robert Sholl, 145–67. Cambridge Composer Studies. Cambridge and New York: Cambridge University Press, 2008. .
 Sherlaw Johnson, Robert. 1989. Messiaen, revised and updated edition. London: J. M. Dent & Sons; Berkeley: University of California Press.  (London);  (Berkeley).

Compositions by Olivier Messiaen
1960 compositions
Compositions for symphony orchestra